Sean Michael Murphy (born October 4, 1994) is an American professional baseball catcher for the Atlanta Braves of Major League Baseball (MLB). He has previously played in MLB for the Oakland Athletics. Murphy made his MLB debut in 2019 with the Athletics and won a Gold Glove Award in 2021.

Amateur career
Murphy attended Centerville High School in Centerville, Ohio, and Wright State University, where he played college baseball for the Wright State Raiders. In 2015, he played collegiate summer baseball with the Orleans Firebirds of the Cape Cod Baseball League, and was named a league all-star. He was drafted by the Oakland Athletics in the third round of the 2016 Major League Baseball draft.

Professional career

Oakland Athletics
Murphy made his professional debut with the Arizona League Athletics, playing one game with them, before being promoted to the Vermont Lake Monsters. He batted .237 with two home runs and seven RBIs in 22 games with Vermont. He started 2017 with the Stockton Ports and was promoted to the Midland RockHounds in June; he batted a combined .250 with 13 home runs and 48 RBIs in 98 games between the two teams. In 2018, he spent the majority of the year with Midland, slashing .288/.358/.498 with eight home runs and 43 RBIs in 68 games. He also played in three games for the Nashville Sounds at the end of the year. He began 2019 with the Las Vegas Aviators where he hit the first home run in Las Vegas Ballpark history.

On September 1, 2019, the Athletics selected Murphy's contract and promoted him to the major leagues. On September 4, in his MLB debut, Murphy hit his first career home run for his first hit against Jake Jewell. In 2020, Murphy played the majority of the season as the A's catcher, playing in 43 games. He hit .233 with 7 home runs and 14 RBI.

Murphy was awarded the Gold Glove Award on November 7, 2021.

Atlanta Braves
On December 12, 2022, the Athletics traded Murphy to the Atlanta Braves in a three-team trade, in which the Athletics acquired pitchers Kyle Muller and Freddy Tarnok, along with catcher Manny Piña and minor league pitcher Royber Salinas from the Braves and utility player Esteury Ruiz from the Milwaukee Brewers. The Brewers also acquired Justin Yeager from the Braves. Murphy and the Braves signed a six-year contract extension worth $73 million and a club option for the 2029 season.

References

External links

Wright State Raiders bio

1994 births
Living people
People from Peekskill, New York
Baseball players from New York (state)
Major League Baseball catchers
Oakland Athletics players
Gold Glove Award winners
Wright State Raiders baseball players
Orleans Firebirds players
Arizona League Athletics players
Vermont Lake Monsters players
Stockton Ports players
Midland RockHounds players
Mesa Solar Sox players
Nashville Sounds players
Las Vegas Aviators players